First Over Germany is a 1988 video game published by Strategic Simulations.

Gameplay
First Over Germany is a game in which a simulation covers the World War II missions of the 306th Bomb Group.

Reception
Hosea Battles reviewed the game for Computer Gaming World, and stated that "Any player that wants to know the human factor of the air war will be interested in this game and those who enjoyed 50 Mission Crush and B-24 will definitely want to play this game."

Reviews
ACE (Advanced Computer Entertainment) - May, 1989
Computer Gaming World - Nov, 1991

References

External links
Review in Compute!'s Gazette

1988 video games
Combat flight simulators
Commodore 64 games
DOS games
Strategic Simulations games
Video games about Nazi Germany
Video games developed in the United States
Video games set in Germany
World War II video games